Krisalis Software Limited was a British  video game developer and publisher founded by Tony Kavanagh, Peter Harrap, and Shaun Hollingworth in 1987 under the name Teque Software Development Limited as a subsidiary label (beginning in 1988) until the official company name was changed to Krisalis Software in 1991. The company was restructured in April 2001 with a new management team of Tony Kavanagh, Tim James and Simeon Pashley and reused the original name of Teque Software development.

Krisalis Software worked on over 60 different computer and console games before permanently closing on 30 November 2001. Along with developing games and conversions themselves, they also provided sound development support for consoles like the Master System, the Game Gear and the Mega Drive through a proprietary Krisalis sound engine created by Shaun Hollingworth and handled by composer Matt Furniss, which was used in many externally developed games for the aforementioned systems. Their final game development was a port of The F.A. Premier League Stars 2001 for the Game Boy Color, released on 8 June 2001.

List of games

Developed

Published

References 

1987 establishments in England
2001 disestablishments in England
Companies based in Rotherham
Defunct companies based in Yorkshire
Video game companies established in 1987
Video game companies disestablished in 2001
Defunct video game companies of the United Kingdom
Video game development companies
Video game publishers